Nazer is a surname. Notable people with the surname include:

Gamal El-Nazer (1930–2006), Egyptian water polo player
Hassan Nazer, British-Iranian film director
Hisham Nazer (1932–2015), Saudi Arabian writer and diplomat
Mende Nazer (born  1982), Sudanese writer and activist

See also
Nader